Raila Orvokki Aho (née Rosendahl; born 31 October 1937 in Pomarkku) is a Finnish office worker and politician. She was a member of the Parliament of Finland, representing the Finnish People's Democratic League (SKDL) from 1987 to 1990 and the Left Alliance from 1990 to 1995.

References

1937 births
Living people
People from Pomarkku
Finnish People's Democratic League politicians
Left Alliance (Finland) politicians
Members of the Parliament of Finland (1987–91)
Members of the Parliament of Finland (1991–95)
20th-century Finnish women politicians
Women members of the Parliament of Finland